Ali Abdulrahman Keda (Arabic: علي كده; born 1973) is a Syrian politician and engineer serving as the third Prime Minister of the Syrian Salvation Government since 2019.

Early life 
Keda was born in Harbanoush, a village in Idlib Governorate, in 1973. He obtained degrees in electrical engineering from the University of Aleppo and military engineering from a state military academy. He then enlisted in the Syrian military, serving as a technician at al-Nayrab military airbase in Aleppo Governorate and being promoted to the rank of lieutenant colonel. In March 2011, at the onset of the Syrian civil war, Keda defected from the military before rejoining six months later. He was arrested and again defected in 2012 after his release.

Keda allegedly served as the deputy head of the Army of Conquest's security department. After its dissolution, he served as a security official with the Sham Legion before resigning. He then worked for the Free Police, but was dismissed after joining the Salvation Government.

Political career 
Keda initially worked with local councils. Under the administration of Fawaz Hilal formed in November 2018, Keda served as Deputy Minister of the Interior for Administrative Affairs and Public Relations. Following the resignation of Hilal's cabinet at the completion of its one-year term, Keda was given thirty days to present a new government to the General Shura Council. On November 18 2019, Keda's government was approved by the General Shura Council and he was elected prime minister, winning 65% of the vote. Shortly after his appointment, he pledged to tackle a surge in the number of internally displaced persons in Idlib.

On March 23 2020, Keda tasked Abdullah al-Shawi with chairing an emergency committee intended to coordinate the administration's response to the COVID-19 pandemic in Syria. He was criticised for attending meetings without a face mask.

In an interview with Le Temps, Keda appealed to the international community to deliver humanitarian assistance to Idlib in coordination with the Salvation Government. He also called on the European Union to "recognize the reality of the situation in Syria", stating that Bashar al-Assad's government was "terrorist".

On 1 December 2020, Keda was re-elected as prime minister by the General Shura Council, winning 81% of the vote. The vote was criticized by opposition activists who compared his appointment with that of Syrian prime minister Hussein Arnous.

References 

People from Idlib Governorate
Anti-government politicians of the Syrian civil war

1973 births
Living people
Syrian military personnel
Syrian defectors